"Consequence Free" is a song recorded by Newfoundland folk band Great Big Sea. It was released in June 1999 as the lead single from their album Turn. It peaked at No. 7 on the Canadian RPM adult contemporary chart and at No. 18 on the Canadian RPM Top Singles.

Chart performance

References

1999 singles
Great Big Sea songs
1999 songs
Warner Music Group singles
Canadian folk songs
Newfoundland and Labrador folk songs